Pilot is an organization that hosts educational workshops for students (usually focused on the high school demographic) to teach them practical skills in computer science and entrepreneurship. Students break into teams and work to build a prototype, then demonstrate the projects they created (generally apps or websites) to a panel of local entrepreneurs. Awards are given to the teams based on their evaluations. Local engineers and designers serve as mentors for the students during the event.

The goal of the program is to teach students creative thinking, practical skills such as the design and coding of an app, and then the skills of pitching the final product to a prospective customer.

History
Pilot was founded by Thomas Jefferson High School for Science and Technology graduates Mayank Jain, Alex Sands, and Gabe Boning after they recognized the need to bring practical computer science and creativity education to more areas across the US in a way that could bypass the slow moving educational curriculum in schools.

Event Locations
Pilot events were originally only hosted at top educational institutions in the United States, and are slowly being rolled out to additional universities and regions. Early event locations included Stanford, MIT, UPenn, and Occidental College, among others.

Event Model
Pilot events are generally either 12 or 24 hours long. Many of the educational techniques are modeled after practices recommend by the d.school at Stanford. They begin with team formation and a brainstorming/ideation phase. Students then wireframe their products and receive feedback from their mentors, usually engineers and designers from the local area. The majority of the time is then spent building a working model of the app or website that is demoed and pitched to a panel of judges for awards.

References

Educational organizations based in the United States